The 2017 NCAA Division III Men's Ice Hockey Tournament was the culmination of the 2016–17 season, the 34th such tournament in NCAA history. It concluded with Norwich defeating Trinity in the championship game 4-1. All First Round and Quarterfinal matchups were held at home team venues, while all succeeding games were played at the Utica Memorial Auditorium in Utica, New York.

Qualifying teams
The following teams qualified for the tournament. Automatic bids were offered to the conference tournament champion of eight different conferences. Four at-large bids were available for the highest-ranked non-automatic qualifiers (overall seed in parentheses).

Format
The tournament featured four rounds of play. All rounds were Single-game elimination.

Because at least four western teams qualified, the tournament was arranged so that there were two eastern and two western quarterfinal brackets. The top two teams from each region were placed in separate quarterfinal brackets and then arranged so that were all to reach the semifinals the top western seed would play the second eastern seed and vise versa.

Since four western teams and eight eastern teams qualified for the tournament all western teams received byes into the quarterfinal round while all eastern teams began in the First Round. The eastern teams were arranged so that the first seed would play the eighth seed, the second seed would play the seventh seed, the third seed would play the sixth seed and the fourth seed would play the fifth seed.

The winner between the fourth- and fifth-seeded eastern teams would play the victor of the first- and eighth-seeded match while the winner between the third- and sixth-seeded eastern teams would play the victor of the second- and seventh-seeded match.

The western teams were arranged so that the first seeded team would play the fourth seeded team while the second seeded team would play the third seeded team.

In the First Round and Quarterfinals the higher-seeded team served as host.

Tournament Bracket

Note: * denotes overtime period(s)

All-Tournament Team
G: Ty Reichenbach (Norwich)
D: Jake Erickson (Norwich)
D: Joey Colatarci (Adrian)
F: Ryan Cole (Trinity)
F: William Pelletier* (Norwich)
F: Tyler Whitney (Trinity)
* Most Outstanding Player(s)

Record by conference

References

External links
Division III Men's Ice Hockey Record Book

 
NCAA Division III ice hockey